Public Responsibility in Medicine and Research (PRIM&R) is a 501(c)(3) nonprofit organization based in Boston, Massachusetts.  The organization was formed in 1974 by a group of researchers who sought to ensure that the concerns and experiences of those working in biomedical research would be reflected in the growing body of federal regulations governing the field.

Among PRIM&R's principal activities are education, membership services, certification programs, public policy initiatives, and professional development programs.  The key constituencies for PRIM&R's programming are human research protection professionals, animal care and use professionals, federal representatives,  institutional officials, researchers and research staff, representatives of pharmaceutical and biotechnology companies, those working with community and voluntary health organizations, and ethicists.

PRIM&R has a membership of more than 4,000 individuals worldwide.

Educational Programs

Annual Conferences

PRIM&R hosts a number of educational programs, including two annual conferences, the Advancing Ethical Research (AER) Conference and the Institutional Animal Care and Use Committee (IACUC) Conference.

The AER Conference is held in the fall of each year, and focuses on human subject protections. This meeting spans three days and draws approximately 2,500 attendees. The structure of the conference generally consists of three to four keynote and plenary addresses, 14 to 16 panels, and more than 120 breakout sessions organized into 25 to 30 topical tracks. Past speakers have included Jay Katz, Francis S. Collins, Rebecca Skloot, Stanley Milgram, Philip Zimbardo, Jerome Groopman, Jonathan Haidt,  Robert Temple, Frances Kelsey, Dan Ariely, Seth Mnookin, Eva Mozes Kor, Louis Lasagna, Keith Norris, Susan Reverby, Joshua Sharfstein, Jonathan Woodson, and Ellen Wright Clayton.

The two-day IACUC Conference focuses on issues pertaining to the care and use of animals in research. It typically draws 600 to 700 attendees, and includes three to four keynote and plenary addresses, four to five panels, and approximately 75 breakout sessions. Past speakers have included Temple Grandin, Bernard Rollin,  Evan Snyder, Colin Blakemore, Henry Spira, Tom Beauchamp, Stuart Zola,  Margaret Landi, and Georgia Mason.

Additionally, PRIM&R has hosted a number of smaller meetings on new developments in research, including dedicated conferences on AIDS, organ transplantation, reproductive technologies, ethical issues in social, behavioral, and educational research (SBER), privacy and confidentiality, conflicts of interest, the responsible conduct of research, and the Health Insurance Portability and Accountability Act (HIPAA).

Pre-Conference Programs

PRIM&R's pre-conference programs, usually one day in length, precede the AER and IACUC conferences, and provide attendees with the opportunity to engage in intensive examination of key areas in the field of research oversight. Each course is aimed at providing participants with an understanding of both the regulatory and ethical precepts underlying work in medical research. Annual pre-conference offerings include:

IRB 101sm (an introduction to the history and regulations that govern the institutional review board (IRB)), 
IACUC 101 (an overview of the laws, regulations, and policies that govern the humane care and use of laboratory animals),
IRB 201 (a detailed look at the criteria for review of research protocols),
Essentials of IACUC Administration (an examination of the key components of an integrated animal care and use program),  and
Advanced Research Ethics (an advanced course that explores complex topics in human research protections).

In addition, special in-depth programs on hot topics in the field are regularly offered. Past programs have addressed informed consent, investigator responsibilities, tissue banking, research in resource-scarce countries, and internet research.

Regional Meetings

PRIM&R offers two to three regional meetings each year to promote shared problem solving, networking, and communication among the research ethics professionals in a given region. Past locations for regional meetings have included Atlanta, Boston, Chicago, Houston, San Francisco, St. Louis, Tucson, Durban, South Africa, Malawi, and Singapore. Courses that have been offered in these cities include Essentials of IACUC Administration, Institutional Review Board (IRB) 101sm, IRB 201, IRB 250, and IRB Administration 101.

At Your Doorstep Programs

At Your Doorstep (AYD) is a customizable offering that brings PRIM&R's educational programming and faculty directly to an institution. Since its launch in 1998, PRIM&R's AYD program has brought its two most popular courses, IRB 101sm and IRB 250, to more than 150 institutions, and has had more than 15,000 participants. AYD events have been hosted by Harvard Medical School, the Kaiser Foundation Research Institute, the US Centers for Disease Control and Prevention, the Mayo Clinic, and Johns Hopkins University.

Webinars

Since 2005, PRIM&R has offered webinars. PRIM&R currently produces between 12 and 14 webinars per year. Some recent webinar topics have included:

Strategies for addressing challenges commonly faced by IACUCs and Institutional Review Board (IRBs)
Applying ethical principles in research conducted abroad, and in research conducted over the internet
Supporting the involvement of community IRB members
Analysis of current events such as the proposed changes to the DHHS "Common Rule."

Webinars are generally taught by two speakers who present complementary aspects of a given topic.

Online Course

PRIM&R developed an interactive online course, titled Ethical Research Oversight Course (EROC), which explores the function and purpose of IRBs.  This course was created to present reliable and affordable research ethics education individuals and institutions. The curriculum of this course is intended to provide IRB members with an understanding of the ethical and regulatory issues that underlie research with human subjects with the use of case studies.

Networking and Professional Programs

Membership

A PRIM&R's membership includes professionals working with human subjects protections programs (HRPPs), animal care and use programs, institutional biosafety programs (IBCs), research ethics committees (RECs), and embryonic stem cell research oversight (ESCRO) committees, such as administrators, researchers, research staff, institutional officials, government representatives, subject advocates, ethicists, policy makers, pharmaceutical and biotechnology personnel, and attorneys.

History of Membership

In 1985, a membership division, the Applied Research Ethics National Association (ARENA), was created within PRIM&R to offer a professional community for IRB and IACUC members, administrators, and others interested in and concerned with applied research ethics.  ARENA's mission was to "promote educational activities, networking, the resolution and/or amelioration of mutual problems, and the professional advancement of its members," and had 61 charter members. In 2006, ARENA membership was integrated into the organization as a whole, and the name ARENA was retired in July of that year.

Networking Programs

PRIM&R offers its members networking opportunities designed to encourage the exchange of knowledge among research ethics professionals, including a Regional Connections  program, which offers small grants to members to plan and host events intended to facilitate collaboration, a Mentoring Program for professionals within the field of research ethics, and an electronic membership directory to facilitate connecting and networking with colleagues.

Organizational Publications and Resources

PRIM&R distributes several e-publications to its members. These include the Research Ethics Digest (RED),  an electronic, bi-monthly compilation of recently published journal articles, news pieces, and essays related to research ethics; and the monthly Member Newsletter,  which contains current information on research ethics and regulatory matters, as well as updates on PRIM&R activities.

In 2006, PRIM&R published a compilation of conference proceedings spanning from 1974-2005, titled PRIM&R Through the Years.

Knowledge Center

The PRIM&R website includes an online Knowledge Center that provides current and historical information and resources to the research community. The Knowledge Center is divided into six domains, each containing resources relating to a specific topic. These topics include selected regulations and guidance; historical cases and documents; PRIM&R program archives; a glossary of common terms; research ethics publications; and a database of best practices, standard operating procedures, and templates for those working in human research protection programs and animal care and use programs.

Ampersand

Launched on November 3, 2008, PRIM&R's blog, Ampersand, is a voice for the research ethics community. Contributions to Ampersand come from a variety of sources, including PRIM&R staff, board members, subject matter experts, members, and others involved in the research field.  Ampersand posts are education-focused and provide commentary on news and issues in the research ethics field. Submissions to Ampersand are welcome from members and nonmembers alike.

Certification

Certified IRB Professional (CIP)

The CIP program is a certification initiative developed in 1999 for individuals administering institutional review boards (IRBs). The CIP credential was developed by a group of PRIM&R volunteers to promote standards for professional knowledge and to support adherence to regulatory requirements, best practices, and ethical standards in the conduct of medical research. Since the credential was launched, more than 2,100 individuals have attained CIP certification.

Certified Professional IACUC Administrator (CPIA)

PRIM&R developed the Certified Professional IACUC Administrator (CPIA) credential in 2006 for individuals administering institutional animal care and use committees (IACUCs). The CPIA credential is intended to provide formal recognition of an IACUC professional's knowledge of IACUC functions and expertise about animal care and use programs more broadly. Since the credential was launched, more than 300 individuals have become CPIA certified.

Public Policy

PRIM&R's Public Policy Committee (PPC) promotes policy development intended to reflect the highest ethical standards and best practices in research involving human subjects and animals. The PPC tracks policy initiatives and regulatory changes issued by government agencies and other organizations. The Committee also oversees the development of oral and written comments on particular policies that it determines are relevant to PRIM&R's mission and warrant PRIM&R's input. Periodically, PRIM&R will appoint a task force to draft comments in response to a particular policy initiative.

Awards
Periodically, PRIM&R bestows awards to recognize those within the research ethics community who have demonstrated excellence in their fields.

Lifetime Achievement Award for Excellence in Research Ethics

This award recognizes individuals who have made extraordinary and exemplary contributions to advancing research ethics, and, more specifically, those who have mastered a large body of information, have applied sound analytical methods to the resolution of particular problems and sound critical methods to the resolutions proposed by themselves or others, have synthesized their findings and those of others into new comprehensive accounts, and have effectively communicated the fruits of their efforts to others.

Founders Award

In 2005, PRIM&R bestowed the Founders Award to Joseph Byrne, Sanford Chodosh, Natalie Reatig, and Barbara Stanley. The award was intended to recognize the leadership, dedication, principles, and wisdom of four individuals who played critical roles in the founding of both PRIM&R and its former membership division, ARENA.

Distinguished Service Award

The Distinguished Service Award is designed to honor PRIM&R members who have not only made a long-standing commitment to PRIM&R, but have also made a valuable contribution to the ethical conduct of research and to enhanced compliance with federal regulations.

ARENA Legacy Award

Established in 2006, this annual award recognizes PRIM&R members who have made an outstanding contribution to the goals of PRIM&R by significantly promoting the ethical conduct of research through mentoring, teaching, and leadership.

Special Service Award

The Special Service Award was given periodically from 2000 to 2005, and was intended "to recognize exemplary individuals who have made a valuable contribution to the goals of our organization and whose achievements promote the ethical conduct of research." Recipients of the Special Service Award were members or nonmembers who made short-term, but vital, contributions to our organization and/or to the field of applied research ethics for human or animal research.

Pillars of PRIM&R
The Pillars of PRIM&R Memorial Fund was created in 2007 to memorialize and honor Louis Lasagna, Herman Wigodsky, and Sandford Chodosh, three former members of PRIM&R's Board of Directors. The Pillars of PRIM&R Memorial Fund provides awards to recognize and nurture early-career professionals who reflect PRIM&R's mission through research ethics scholarship, and potential for leadership in the field.

Organizational structure

PRIM&R's headquarters are located in Park Square in Boston, Massachusetts. PRIM&R is governed by a Board of Directors who are responsible for determining and developing policy for the organization. The 23 members of the Board supervise and direct the affairs of PRIM&R via a committee structure. PRIM&R's Board represents multiple professional disciplines and institutional settings, including biomedical research, social science/behavioral research, research subject and/or patient advocacy, pharmaceutical/biotechnology industry, health law, animal research, international research, policy development, academic research ethics, public health, and a range of related disciplines. PRIM&R employs approximately 20 individuals who coordinate and execute organizational functions ranging from conference planning and the development of new educational programs, to membership outreach and recruitment, to drafting public policy comments.

See also
Research ethics
Human Subject Research
Belmont Report
Unethical human experimentation in the United States
Clinical trial
Informed consent
Tuskegee syphilis experiment
Research ethics
Office for Human Research Protections
Common Rule
Guidelines for human subject research

References

External links
Public Responsibility in Medicine and Research (PRIM&R) records, 1972-2014, University Archives and Special Collections, Joseph P. Healey Library, University of Massachusetts Boston

Educational organizations based in the United States
501(c)(3) organizations